The Zoologist was a monthly natural history magazine established in 1843 by Edward Newman and published in London. Newman acted as editor-in-chief until his death in 1876, when he was succeeded, first by James Edmund Harting (1876–1896), and later by William Lucas Distant (1897–1916).

Originating from an enlargement of The Entomologist, The Zoologist contained long articles, short notes, comments on current events, and book reviews covering the entire Animal Kingdom throughout the world, until The Entomologist was separated again in 1864. Initially, half of the space was devoted to birds, rising to two-thirds later.

In 1916 The Zoologist was amalgamated with British Birds (founded 1908).

Founders 
At the death of Frederick Bond, in 1889, James Edmund Harting, who was then the editor of The Zoologist, wrote an extensive memorial (of nearly twenty-two pages). In this text he reminded that Bond was "one of those who—with the brothers Doubleday, Thomas Bell, William Borrer, Bree, Couch, W.B. Fisher, J.H. Gurney, Hewitson, Waring Kidd, A.E. Knox, Bodd, Salmon, Frederick Smith, William Thompson, and Yarrell (...)—helped the late Edward Newman to found" The Zoologist.

Editors 
The first editor of The Zoologist was Edward Newman. He died in 1876. Volume 11 of the second series, the thirty-fourth volume of the journal, was the last volume with which he was connected.

The third series, starting in 1877 and ending in 1896, was edited by James Edmund Harting.

William Lucas Distant was the editor of the fourth series, from 1878 to 1914 (vol. 18).

The last two volumes of the fourth series, and of the journal, were edited by Frank Finn.

Four series 
The Zoologist appeared in four series:
 First series: 1843–1865 ( vol. 1 – 23)
 Second series: 1866–1876 (vol. 1 – 10)
 Third series: 1877–1896 (vol. 1 – 20)
 Fourth series: 1897–1916 (vol. 1 – 20)

First series, 1843–1865 
The first series of The Zoologist was edited by Edward Newman and published by John Van Voorst in London. From the beginning Newman received contributions from many naturalists. In the first year for instance John Christopher Atkinson, Henry Doubleday, John Henry Gurney Sr., Frederick Bond, and William Yarrell wrote articles. Newman also contributed articles himself.

In general, the first volumes were published in monthly issues of 32 pages, and also as an annual. The pages were numbered continuously, so for instance the first issue of the fourth volume (January, 1846) was numbered pp. 1201–1232 and the twelfth issue of the twenty-third volume (December, 1865) was numbered 9825–9848.

Second series, 1866–1876 
The second series, containing eleven volumes, was also edited by Newman. Starting in January, 1866, the page numbering started anew on page 1 and ended with page 5180 in December, 1876.

Third series, 1877–1896 
Editor: James Edmund Harting.

Fourth series, 1897–1916 
Editor: William Lucas Distant.

In 1899 Edmund Selous wrote his first articles, in The Zoologist, about his observations near a nest of Nightjars (Caprimulgus europaeus). A year later he published his study on "the Great Plover", the Eurasian stone-curlew, Burhinus oedicnemus. 

In 1899 Henry Eliot Howard published his first articles in the magazine, about birds in North Worcestershire and in the North-West of Ireland.

In 1900 the naturalist Arthur Henry Patterson published the first part of his study on the birds of Great Yarmouth and surroundings.

Articles 
Among the numerous articles that appeared in The Zoologist over the years were:
 
 
 
 
  (Published in three parts)
 
 
  (Published in five parts in volume 4 and 5)

See also
 List of zoology journals

References

Sources

External links

 Digitised copies of all volumes online at the Biodiversity Heritage Library.

1843 establishments in the United Kingdom
1916 disestablishments in the United Kingdom
Animal and pet magazines
Monthly magazines published in the United Kingdom
History magazines published in the United Kingdom
Journals and magazines relating to birding and ornithology
Magazines published in London
Magazines established in 1843
Magazines disestablished in 1916
Nature magazines
Wildlife magazines